King of Kings, or KOK, is a European kickboxing promotion founded in 2009. The company has its headquarters in Vilnius, Lithuania.

History
The promotion held its first event in Lithuania in 2009. The promotion has since held over 100 events in multiple countries including in Latvia, Lithuania, Moldova, Poland, Estonia, Russia, Germany and Cyprus. The promotion held its first event in Estonia in 2015. First event in Finland was held in 2019. In the past King of Kings also co-promoted events with K-1. Events in Moldova were promoted with FEA.

Name
Similarly to K-1, the K's in the KOK name stand for Kickboxing, K-1, Karate, Kung-Fu, and other stand-up fight sports and martial arts. They also stand for “King” so “King of Kings” is meant as the best in the world.

Media coverage
KOK is broadcast on FightBox, DAZN, TV3 Sport, Prime Fight, Eleven Sports and Fight Network.

In January 2022, a distribution partnership through United Fight Alliance on U.S. networks was announced.

A 3-year global broadcast deal with DAZN was announced 30 September 2022.

KOK was previously broadcast across Europe on Eurosport in 2014 and 2015. Other past broadcasters include BTV, Canal 3 and TV6.

Rules
Fights in KOK are fought mostly under Kickboxing rules, but events also include fights under MMA and Boxing rules.

Events

Champions

Current champions

KOK Heavyweight Championship
Weight limit: Unlimited

KOK Light heavyweight Championship
Weight limit:

KOK Middleweight Championship
Weight limit:

KOK Welterweight Championship
Weight limit:

KOK Lightweight Championship
Weight limit:

KOK Featherweight Championship
Weight limit:

KOK Bantamweight Championship
Weight limit:

KOK Flyweight Championship
Weight limit:

KOK Women's Bantamweight Championship
Weight limit:

KOK Women's Strawweight Championship
Weight limit:

Notable fighters

  Artur Kyshenko
  Constantin Țuțu
  Daniel Forsberg 
  Pavel Zhuravlev
  Sergej Maslobojev
  Masoud Minaei

See also
 Lithuania Bushido Federation

Notes

References

External links

Kickboxing organizations
Sports organizations established in 2009
Kickboxing in Europe
Kickboxing in Lithuania
2009 establishments in Lithuania
Mixed martial arts organizations
Mixed martial arts in Europe
Sports organizations of Lithuania
Sport in the Baltic states
Lithuanian television shows
Professional boxing organizations
Companies based in Vilnius
Entertainment companies of Lithuania
Kickboxing television series
Recurring events established in 2009
Recurring sporting events established in 2009